Jinkinson is a surname, similar to Jinkins, Jenkinson, Jenkins and Jenkyns. Notable people with this surname include:
Alan Jinkinson (1935–2022), British trade union leader
Earl Jinkinson (died 1995), American antitrust lawyer and father of Georgia Bonesteel
Georgia Bonesteel (née Jinkinson) (born 1936), American quilter, author and television host

See also
Jinkinson v Oceana Gold (NZ) Ltd, a 2009 New Zealand court case

English-language surnames
Surnames of English origin
Surnames of British Isles origin